"The Star" is the third and final segment of the thirteenth episode from the first season (1985–86) of the American television series The Twilight Zone, which was a Christmas-themed episode. This segment is based on the short story "The Star" by Arthur C. Clarke, published in Infinity Science Fiction (November 1955). It centers on a space expedition's chance discovery of the Star of Bethlehem.

Plot
On an interstellar journey, astrophysicists Dr. Chandler and Fr. Matthew Costigan (a Jesuit priest) have a debate over whether God exists or if the wonders they view are random occurrences. Their spaceship picks up a subspace signal from a long-dead world. Upon landing on the planet, the explorers discover that it holds the last remains of a race that was destroyed by a supernova. Their civilization was quite advanced, and remnants are found of art and other pieces of their culture. A computer record shows that they had one thousand years of peace before their extinction. Both Dr. Chandler and Fr. Costigan are deeply upset at the race's tragic demise, making their argument over religion turn bitter.

To his dismay, Fr. Matthew calculates that the star went supernova in the year 3120 B.C. and that the light produced from this explosion was "The Star of Bethlehem" that shone down on Earth the day Jesus was born. Fr. Matthew's trust in God is shaken, arguing that it is unfair that God choose this star to herald the divine birth when numerous stars from uninhabited systems were available.

Dr. Chandler apologizes for their bitter words earlier and comforts him by translating a poem he found among the archives of the dead culture. It says that one should mourn not for them, for they lived in peace and saw the beauty of the universe, but for those who live in pain and those who never see the light of peace. Dr. Chandler says that in dying, they passed their light onto another world, and that they can hope to one day do the same.

Production
The original script for "The Star" demanded much more elaborate sets, and by the admission of its writer, Alan Brennert, probably would have ended up not being made due to budget constraints. He credits The Twilight Zone story consultant Harlan Ellison for suggesting that the opening scene be done with a "limbo set" i.e. a black interior stylishly lit with a few isolated pieces of furniture. The 1960s TV series The Outer Limits frequently used such sets when under particularly tight budgets, and doing the opening scene in this way allowed "The Star" to be produced. Ellison also suggested that Gerd Oswald, who had directed many episodes of The Outer Limits, including one written by Ellison, be the director.

Brennert wanted Donald Moffat, whom he had worked with on an unproduced series called The Mississippi, to play Fr. Matthew Costigan, but Oswald said he could not see Moffat as a priest and insisted on Fritz Weaver in the role, with Moffat playing Dr. Chandler.

The planetary surface was a matte painting.

While Clarke's story ended with the priest in despair after the revelation that the alien civilization had perished in order to light "the Christmas star," the TV episode added an epitaph by the aliens, revealing their acceptance of their place in the universe. Brennert later commented that "Over the years I've taken a little bit of heat from certain fans in the science fiction community for changing the ending of this story. I actually maintain that the ending as it is in this episode is implicit in the story and is not really at odds with the kind of metaphysical work that Clarke did in Childhood's End." He also stated that prior to filming the episode, Clarke was asked if he objected to the different ending, and as The Twilight Zone team never received a reply to this query, they concluded that Clarke had no objections.

References

External links
 

Adaptations of works by Arthur C. Clarke
1985 American television episodes
American Christmas television episodes
Atheism in television
The Twilight Zone (1985 TV series season 1) episodes
Television episodes about religion
Television shows based on short fiction
Religion in science fiction
Fiction about supernovae
Star of Bethlehem
Television episodes directed by Gerd Oswald

fr:L'Étoile du berger